Memorial to the International Brigades is a memorial structure, located in the campus of the Universidad Complutense de Madrid, dedicated to the members of the International Brigade who fought in the Spanish Civil War. Erected on 22 October 2011, the monument has been vandalised, and in 2013 the Supreme Court in Madrid upheld a complaint that the monument was a violation of local planning regulations and should be removed. The university replied by insisting that the local government had not acknowledged the application that they had made.

References

Monuments and memorials in Madrid
Buildings and structures in Ciudad Universitaria neighborhood, Madrid